Olgica Bakajin is a scientist working at Porifera, Inc.

Biography
Bakajin completed her B.A. in Physics and Chemistry from the University of Chicago and her Ph.D. in Physics from Princeton University. She then worked at Lawrence Livermore National Laboratory. In 2009 she founded Porifera.

Research
Carbon nanotube technology for water desalination from Bakajin's company, Porifera, has been licensed to Lawrence Livermore National Laboratory.

Honours and awards
 2007 - NanoTech Briefs Award
 2010 - Fellow of the American Physical Society for "contributions to the development of new instrumentation for studies of protein folding and for fundamental understanding of transport and selectivity at nano-scale, with implications to understanding of membrane channels."

Publications

References

External links
 Porifera, Inc.
 

Living people
Year of birth missing (living people)
Place of birth missing (living people)
Fellows of the American Physical Society
University of Chicago alumni
Princeton University alumni
Lawrence Livermore National Laboratory staff